Mike Weaver is a politician and retired military officer from the U.S. state of Kentucky. He served as a member of the Kentucky House of Representatives 1996–2007, representing the 26th District. He was elected the mayor of Radcliff, Kentucky  2015–2018. Weaver is a member of the Democratic Party.

Weaver served in the United States Navy as a young man; he later joined the U.S. Army.  He fought in the Vietnam War. He became an Army officer after graduating from Officer Candidate School. He is considered a Fighting Dem.

In the Kentucky House of Representatives, Weaver helped found a conservative caucus of Democrats in the state House called the Commonwealth Democrats. That group challenged the Democratic House leadership in the fall of 2005 because they felt the leaders had allowed the Republican Party to paint them as liberal. Many of them, including Weaver, also supported the tax modernization plan of Republican Governor Ernie Fletcher early on.

In 2007, Weaver sought the Democratic nomination for Kentucky state treasurer.

A Roman Catholic, Weaver and his wife Lois have four children.

Weaver was elected to a four-year term as mayor of the City of Radcliff, Kentucky from January 2015 to December 2018 along with city council members Barbara Baker, Stan Holmes, Edward Palmer, TW Shortt, Kim Thompson, and Chris Yates, each for a two-year term. He was succeeded in 2018 by JJ Duvall. Weaver succeeded Duvall in 2014 after he ran for Judge-Executive.

References

External links
2006 Campaign site
Article on the campaign
FEC - contributions to Weaver

|-

Living people
Year of birth missing (living people)
Democratic Party members of the Kentucky House of Representatives
United States Army officers
People from Radcliff, Kentucky
American Roman Catholics
United States Navy sailors